Natia Pantsulaia (born 28 December 1991) is a Ukrainian footballer of Georgian descent who plays as midfielder for Vorskla Poltava in the Ukrainian Women's League and in the Ukraine national team.

Playing career

Club
Pantsulaia played in Ukraine for FC Rodyna Lyceum in Kostopil and FC Ternopolianka in Ternopil, WFC Zhytlobud-1 Kharkiv and WFC Lehenda-ShVSM Chernihiv. She played in all three matches of the 2016–17 UEFA Women's Champions League qualifying round with WFC Zhytlobud-1 Kharkiv.

In 2018, she moved to Turkey, and joined newly promoted Turkish Women's First League team ALG Spor in Gaziantep.

In July 2019, Pantsulaia joined Spanish Primera División team Atlético Madrid.

In December 2019, she rescinded her contract with Atlético Madrid. In the second half of the 2019-20 Turkish Women's First League season, she returned to Turkey joining her previous club ALG Spor. On 10 September 2020, she left Turkey to return home. She joined Zhytlobud-2.

International
Pantsulaia was a member of the Ukraine women's national U-19 team. She made her debut at the 2010 UEFA Women's U-19 Championship First qualifying round – Group 10 match against Cyprus women's U-19 team on 19 September 2009.

She played in four of the 2019 FIFA Women's World Cup qualification – Group 4 matches with the Ukraine women's national team.

Career statistics
.

Honours 
Lehenda-ShVSM Chernihiv
 Ukrainian Women's Cup 
Runners-up 2017–18

Turkish Women's First League
 ALG Spor
Champion   (1): 2019–20
Runners-up (1): 2018–19

References

1991 births
Living people
Ukrainian women's footballers
Women's association football midfielders
WFC Rodyna Kostopil players
WFC Zhytlobud-1 Kharkiv players
WFC Lehenda-ShVSM Chernihiv players
ALG Spor players
Atlético Madrid Femenino players
WFC Zhytlobud-2 Kharkiv players
Ukraine women's international footballers
Ukrainian expatriate women's footballers
Ukrainian expatriate sportspeople in Turkey
Expatriate women's footballers in Turkey
Ukrainian expatriate sportspeople in Spain
Expatriate women's footballers in Spain
Ukrainian expatriate sportspeople in Romania
Expatriate women's footballers in Romania
Ukrainian women's futsal players
Ukrainian people of Georgian descent